Das Phantom (The Phantom) is a 2000 German thriller TV movie directed by Dennis Gansel. It is based on the book Das RAF-Phantom and stars Jürgen Vogel.

Plot
Policeman Leon Kramer (Vogel) and his partner Pit (Sözer) are observing two people in a car. When Leon goes to fetch some coffee, the two people in the car and Pit are killed. Suspicion is placed on Leon and, when his boss is also killed shortly thereafter, he becomes a fugitive. He learns that one of the two people he observed is an ex-Red Army Faction terrorist and the other is his former lawyer. A friend of the lawyer (Berricke) contacts Leon and gives him information about the RAF. The father of the dead terrorist also provides information. Leon learns that there may be a conspiracy among important people in the government using terrorist groups for their own purposes. Now they are after him.

Cast
 Jürgen Vogel as Leo Kramer
 Nadeshda Brennicke as Anne
 Mathias Herrmann as Commissioner Faber
 Hilmi Sözer as Pit
 Peter Bongartz as Philipp Böhn
 Dietrich Hollinderbäumer as Baré
 Lukas Miko as Andreas Ganz
 Ulrich Pleitgen as Dr. Hausmann
 Thomas Holtzmann as Hans
 Carola Regnier as Sabine Ganz
 Wookie Mayer as Monica Hausmann
 Heinrich Giskes as Paul Dussous
Hans-Jürgen Schmiebusch as Minister

See also
 The Baader Meinhof Complex

References

2000 television films
2000 films
Films directed by Dennis Gansel
German television films
2000s German-language films
Grimme-Preis for fiction winners
ProSieben original programming